Heterogeneous nuclear ribonucleoprotein A3 is a protein that in humans is encoded by the HNRNPA3 gene.

References

Further reading